The 29th Army Corps was an Army corps in the Imperial Russian Army.

Part of
11th Army: 1914 - 1915
3rd Army: 1915
13th Army: 1915
3rd Army: 1915 - 1916
6th Army: 1917
9th Army: 1917

Commanders
1914-1915: Dmitry Zuyev

References 
 

Corps of the Russian Empire